The 1991–92 Macedonian Republic League was the 48th and last season since its establishment. Sasa won their first and only championship title.

It was the last season of the Macedonian Republic League as part of the Yugoslav football league system. On September 8, 1991, Macedonia declared independence, and the first 7 teams joined the newly-formed Macedonian First Football League.

Participating teams

Final table

References

External links
Football Federation of Macedonia 

Macedonian Football League seasons
Yugo
4